Zachary Zimmer is a Canadian sociologist, currently a Canada Research Chair in Aging and Community at Mount Saint Vincent University.

References

Year of birth missing (living people)
Living people
Academic staff of Mount Saint Vincent University
Canadian gerontologists
Canadian sociologists
Medical sociologists
University of Winnipeg alumni
University of Manitoba alumni